Mary Howgill (1623 – before 1681) was a prominent early member of the Religious Society of Friends (Quakers) in England. She is best known for her public defense of Quakers in a 1656 letter to Oliver Cromwell. She delivered the letter in person and subsequently had a long discourse with Cromwell. She began the letter:

The letter was written during a time of religious persecution, and challenges political and religious authorities that punished statements of religious conscience with confiscation of property, physical violence, and imprisonment.

Life
She was probably the sister of Francis Howgill of Grayrigg, Westmoreland.  Both wrote letters to Cromwell and both were imprisoned as a result.  She had been imprisoned earlier for public preaching of Quaker doctrines in Kendal in 1653.

She wrote a second pamphlet, "The Vision of the Lord of Hosts". This pamphlet was written after King Charles II was returned to the throne, and described a dream in which her God tells her of the terrible persecutions of Quakers about to happen:

See also
English Dissenters
Levellers
Ordination of women

References 

English Quakers
Converts to Quakerism
People from Westmorland
1623 births
1681 deaths
17th-century Quakers
17th-century English women